Bariran (also Romanized as Barīrān; also known as Barīvān) is a village in Tulem Rural District, Tulem District, Sowme'eh Sara County, Gilan Province, Iran. At the 2006 census, its population was 363, in 98 families.

References 

Populated places in Sowme'eh Sara County